Youssef Moughfire  (born 1 December 1976) is a French former professional footballer who played as a midfielder.

External links
 
 
 

1976 births
Living people
French footballers
French expatriate footballers
Association football midfielders
CS Sedan Ardennes players
Thouars Foot 79 players
Olympique Noisy-le-Sec players
AS Cannes players
Panachaiki F.C. players
SSV Ulm 1846 players
Czech First League players
FK Viktoria Žižkov players
FC DAC 1904 Dunajská Streda players
FC Senec players
Slovak Super Liga players
French expatriate sportspeople in the Czech Republic
Expatriate footballers in the Czech Republic
French expatriate sportspeople in Slovakia
Expatriate footballers in Slovakia
French expatriate sportspeople in Greece
Expatriate footballers in Greece
French expatriate sportspeople in Germany
Expatriate footballers in Germany